The 2009 Khyber Pass offensive was an offensive military campaign by Pakistani Army against Islamic militants from Lashkar-e-Islam in and near the Khyber Pass. The offensive was launched after a series of suicide bombings, including one at a police station where 17 cadets were killed. After two months, Pakistan Army defeated the militants and cleared the area from the militants.

Military offensives
Pakistan Army launched an offensive campaign against militants after series of suicide bombings. The Pakistan Army infantry troops quickly launched operation which concluded with destroyed 4 militant bases, killed 40 militants, and captured 43 militants, according to Pakistan Army. Human Rights organizations claim Pakistani security forces executed surrendering militants, a claim which was denied by Pakistan. Outside a press briefing to journalists by local governor Tariq Hayat, a truck loaded with the bodies of militants and weapons seized from militants were displayed outside of the press briefing. Hayat gave no indication whether this would be a sustained offensive. Fighting continued, with large numbers of militants being killed or captured. 2 Pakistani soldiers were killed when their vehicle hit a land mine.

See also
 Khyber pass
 Federally Administered Tribal Areas
 Operation Zarb-e-Azb
 Mohmand Offensive

References 

Khyber Pass Offensive, 2009
Khyber_Pass_offensive
Khyber_Pass_offensive
Khyber_Pass_offensive
Khyber_Pass_offensive
Khyber_Pass_offensive